The U.S. National Commission on Fire Prevention and Control was a Presidential Commission appointed by President Richard Nixon in June 1971. It submitted its final report, America Burning, in May 1973.

Background
The Fire Research and Safety Act of 1968 provided a mandate for a Presidential Commission to be established for research into the hazards of death, injury, and property damage caused by fire. Public Law 90-259 authorized a twenty-member commission to conduct a two-year study aiming to determine effective measures for reducing the destructive effects of fire.

Activities
During 1972, the Presidential Task Force conducted regional hearings across the United States surveying communities with regards to flammable incidences. The Presidential Commission concluded their study on May 4, 1973, submitting a report to President Nixon entitled America Burning: The Report of The National Commission on Fire Prevention and Control. On July 12, 1973, President Nixon released a presidential statement commending the National Commission on their analysis and findings related to fire safety and the fire loss dilemma in the United States.

Commissioners
Nixon appointed commissioners for the National Commission on Fire Prevention and Control in June 1971.

References

1968 in law
90th United States Congress
United States national commissions
Firefighting in the United States
Fire prevention